The Elsie Locke Non-Fiction Award was first awarded in 2002 by the Library and Information Association of New Zealand Aotearoa (LIANZA). It aimed to encourage the production of the best non-fiction writing for young New Zealanders. The award was previously known as the LIANZA Young People's Non-Fiction Award, before being renamed in honour of Elsie Locke. The LIANZA Elsie Locke Non-Fiction Award became the Elsie Locke Non-Fiction Award when the LIANZA Awards merged with the New Zealand Book Awards for Children and Young Adults in 2016.

History 
The LIANZA Elsie Locke Non-Fiction Award was an initiative of the Library and information Association of New Zealand Aotearoa (LIANZA). The LIANZA Children and Young Adult Book Awards began in 1945 with the Esther Glen Award. Later they expanded to encompass a wide range of awards for non-fiction, young adult, illustration, works in Te Reo Māori and librarian’s choice as well as fiction. The Awards were judged by a panel of experienced librarians.

The non-fiction award, established in 1986, was first known as the LIANZA Young People’s Non-Fiction Award. Its aim was to encourage the writing and production of high-quality non-fiction books for young New Zealand readers. 

In 2002, it was renamed the LIANZA Elsie Locke Non-fiction Award to commemorate the life and work of Elsie Locke (1912–2001), whose own fiction and non-fiction for children often focused on New Zealand history. Elsie Locke was a writer, historian, peace activist and campaigner for women’s rights, social justice, nuclear disarmament and the environment. She won a number of awards for her writing including the Gaelyn Gordon Award for a Much-Loved Book and the Margaret Mahy Medal. Her historical children’s novels included The Runaway Settlers (1965), The End of the Harbour (1969) and A Canoe in the Mist (1984), and her non-fiction for young people included Two Peoples, One Land: A History of Aotearoa (1988).

In 2016, the LIANZA Awards were merged with the New Zealand Book Awards for Children and Young Adults. The Award is now called the Elsie Locke Award for Non-Fiction.

List of recipients

See also 

 List of New Zealand literary awards

References

External links 

 LIANZA Elsie Locke Non-Fiction Award on Christchurch City Libraries website
 LIANZA Elsie Locke Non-Fiction Award on the LIANZA website

New Zealand non-fiction literary awards